Belau Air is a Palauan airline with its headquarters in Koror City. Belau Air is the only air carrier operating solely throughout the island nation of Palau, having its hub at Roman Tmetuchl International Airport in the state of Airai nearby the country's main city and former capital Koror. Belau Air currently owns only one small plane, a Cessna 150, which can hold one passenger. The service makes daily flights to the Palauan states of Peleliu and Angaur, both of which are small island communities southwest of the State of Koror. The plane is also used for tourism and offers tours throughout Palau's Rock Islands. The airline does not travel internationally, and other airlines are used to travel into and out of Palau. 
Shuttle service is provided to transport passengers from the Roman Tmetuchl International Airport in Airai to Koror.

Destinations

References

External links

 Website on underwatercolours.com 

Airlines of Palau
Airlines established in 1989
1989 establishments in Oceania